The  is a document written by the founder of the Japanese Jōdo Shū (Pure Land) Buddhism school, Hōnen, two days before his death. The document is meant to summarize Hōnen's teachings for future generations, and serves as his final testament. The document was written on the twenty-third day of the first lunar month of the second year of Kenryaku (1212) and contains fewer than three hundred words. It is regularly read and recited in Jōdo Shū services to this day.

The document affirms Hōnen's belief that ultimately sentient beings are deluded and ignorant, but that through the entrusting of Amida Buddha, and through the recitation of the nembutsu, one can be reborn in the Pure Land.

The original Japanese, with romanization is as follows:

An English translation of the One-Sheet Document is as follows: 

There is some controversy regarding translation of the term  as potentially pejorative toward women, but is generally interpreted from a standpoint of humility, not merit.

References 

Jōdo-shū
Hōnen
Buddhism in the Kamakura period